Yugoslavia competed at the 1988 Winter Paralympics in Innsbruck, Austria. The country's delegation consisted of three competitors in alpine skiing.

Alpine skiing

See also
Yugoslavia at the 1988 Winter Olympics

References

Nations at the 1988 Winter Paralympics
1988 Winter
Paralympics